This is a list of High Sheriffs of Carmarthenshire. Carmarthenshire was originally created by the Statute of Rhuddlan in 1284. It became an administrative county in 1889 with a county council following the Local Government Act 1888. Under the Local Government Act 1972, the administrative county of Carmarthenshire was abolished on 1 April 1974 and the area of Carmarthenshire became three districts within the new county of Dyfed : Carmarthen, Dinefwr and Llanelli. Under the Local Government (Wales) Act 1994, Dyfed was abolished on 1 April 1996 and the three districts united to form a unitary authority which had the same boundaries as the original Carmarthenshire but remaining in the shrievalty of Dyfed.

List of Sheriffs

1424-1426: Sir John Skydemore of Kentchurch, Herefs.
1432-1435: Griffith Dwnn, of Mudlescwm, Kidwelly (father of Sir John, below)
1436: Sir Gruffudd ap Nicolas
1438: Sir Edward Stradling
1463: Sir John Dwn of Kidwelly

16th century

17th century

18th century

19th century

20th century

References

 
Carmarthenshire
Carmarthenshire